Ivan Vukčević (born 4 December 2001) is a Montenegrin professional footballer who plays as a forward for Vojvodina.

Club career

Vojvodina
On 12 January 2022, he signed a two and a half years contract with Serbian SuperLiga club Vojvodina.

International career
Vukčević was called in Montenegro U15, Montenegro U17, Montenegro U18, Montenegro U19 and Montenegro U21 national team squads.

Career statistics

References

External links
 
 
 

2001 births
Living people
Montenegrin footballers
Montenegro youth international footballers 
Association football forwards
FK Zeta players
FK Vojvodina players
Montenegrin First League players
Serbian SuperLiga players